Orphnodactylis is a genus of fungi in the family Phyllachoraceae.

Species
As accepted by Species Fungorum;
Orphnodactylis kalmiae 
Orphnodactylis wittrockii

References

Phyllachorales
Sordariomycetes genera